Michael Finney (journalist) is an American news presenter and talk show host. 
}}</ref> Finney currently works as a journalist for KPIX.

References 

Living people
American male journalists
Year of birth missing (living people)
American talk radio hosts
American television journalists